The foreign secretary of India (IAST: Videśa Saciva) is the top diplomat of India and administrative head of the Ministry of External Affairs. This post is held by an Indian foreign service officer of the rank of secretary to the government of India. Vinay Mohan Kwatra is an Indian diplomat and currently serving as the Foreign Secretary of India from May 2022, succeeding Harsh Vardhan Shringla.

As an officer of the rank of secretary to the government of India, the foreign secretary ranks 23rd on the Indian Order of Precedence. However, unlike other secretaries to the government of India, the foreign secretary is also the top diplomat of the country and heads the 'Foreign Service Board'.

Powers, responsibilities and postings 
The foreign secretary is the administrative head of the Ministry of External Affairs, and is the principal adviser to the minister of external affairs on all matters of policy and administration within the External Affairs Ministry.

The role of the foreign secretary is as follows:
 To act as the administrative head of the Ministry of External Affairs. The responsibility in this regard is complete and undivided.
 To act as the chief adviser to the Minister of External Affairs on all aspects of policy and administrative affairs.
 To represent the Ministry of External Affairs before the Public Accounts Committee of the Parliament of India.
 Recommends postings of officers under the Ministry of External Affairs of the rank of secretary, additional secretary and joint secretary to the Appointments Committee of the Cabinet (ACC).
 To act as the first among equals among the Secretaries in the Ministry of External Affairs.

Emolument, accommodation and perquisites 
The foreign secretary is eligible for a Diplomatic passport. The official earmarked residence of the union foreign secretary is 3, Circular Road, Chanakyapuri, New Delhi.

List of foreign secretaries

See also
 Cabinet Secretary of India
 Defence Secretary of India
 Home Secretary of India
 Finance Secretary of India

References

External links
 Ministry of External Affairs, Official website
 Indian Foreign Secretaries Listing
 External Affairs Spouses Association or EASA

Indian diplomats
Indian Foreign Secretaries